Marion Laborde (born 9 December 1986, Dax) is a French professional basketball player. She plays for France women's national basketball team. She has competed in the 2012 Summer Olympics, winning the silver medal.

References

1986 births
Living people
French women's basketball players
Olympic basketball players of France
Basketball players at the 2012 Summer Olympics
Olympic medalists in basketball
Olympic silver medalists for France
Medalists at the 2012 Summer Olympics
Knights of the Ordre national du Mérite
People from Dax, Landes
Sportspeople from Landes (department)